Simon Peddie (born 8 January 1981) is a footballer who plays for Hashtag United in the Essex Senior League. He represented the Montserrat national team in 2014.

Club career
Peddie joined Cheshunt from Leyton in March 2006. He went on to play for Boreham Wood having signed from Woodbridge Town in February 2008 by George Borg.

He went on to make over 100 appearances for Redbridge before joining Isthmian League Division One North club, East Thurrock United on 23 October 2010.

International career
Peddie has played twice for the Montserrat national football team, with both appearances coming in qualifying for the 2014 Caribbean Cup. His début came on 30 May 2014 in the 1–0 win over U.S. Virgin Islands at home at Blakes Estate Stadium, Lookout, Montserrat. Peddie's second cap came in the 0–0 home draw with Bonaire on 3 June 2014.

Style of play
Former Cheshunt manager Tom Loizou described Peddie as "a versatile player, capable of playing anywhere across the back four, or in midfield".

References

External links

1981 births
Living people
Montserratian footballers
Montserrat international footballers
Association football defenders
Association football midfielders
National League (English football) players
Isthmian League players
Leyton F.C. players
Cheshunt F.C. players
Woodbridge Town F.C. players
Boreham Wood F.C. players
Redbridge F.C. players
East Thurrock United F.C. players
Tilbury F.C. players
Hashtag United F.C. players